London Betty is a 2009 American comedy/adventure film directed and written by Thomas Edward Seymour. The film includes performances by Nicole Lewis, Daniel von Bargen (in his final performance), Russ Russo, and director Seymour, as well as narration by Clint Howard. London Betty made the list of "Top Films of the Year" on Moviesmademe.com in 2009. Originally having a theatrical release in 2009, the film was released on DVD in 2010 through Maverick Entertainment on their Platinum Label. In May 2011 London Betty hit the #3 spot for British comedy on Amazon on Demand. The film was nationally distributed at Blockbuster Video until the company went out of business in 2013. Director Tom Seymour affectionately referred to this film and his two other features as the "Backyard Trilogy" consisting of Everything Moves Alone, Land of College Prophets and London Betty. The three films all involve backyard thieves or in the case of Land of College Prophets superheroes that all dwell in suburban environments all shot within central Connecticut.

Background

Plot
London Betty (Nicole Lewis) is the plucky British journalist who gets a newspaper job in the small American town of Pharisee. But trying to get an audience with her elusive, agoraphobic publisher Maury (Daniel von Bargen) is only part of her problem. Her first story requires the toppling of the corrupt and perverted administration run by Mayor Plumb (Dick Boland) and his band of off-kilter hoodlums. However, Betty has unlikely allies to help her bring down the mayor: a pair of petty thieves, Volga (Russ Russo) and Billy (Thomas Edward Seymour), a golden-hearted prostitute Jess (Margaret Rose Champagne) and a transvestite ex-Marine hitman, Sgt. Stone (Phil Hall).

Partial cast
 Clint Howard as Narrator (voice)
 Daniel von Bargen as Maury
 Thomas Edward Seymour as Billy
 Russ Russo as Volgo
 Phil Hall as Sgt. Stone
 Matt Ford as Roy McCoy
 Nicole Lewis as London Betty
 Margaret Rose Champagne as Jess
 Dick Boland as Mayor Plumb
 Philip Guerette as Todd
 Sheri Lynn as Cindy
 Rachael Robbins as Mindy
 Chris Ferry as Karate Stan
 Jonathan Gorman as Stanley

Reception

Awards and recognition

 Won Best Connecticut film at the Silk City Film Festival
 Won Best Feature Film at the Accolade Film Festival 2008
 Won the Underground Spirit Award at the New Haven Underground Film Festival
 Best Actress nomination Nicole Lewis: Hoboken International Film Festival 2009
 Best Dramedy Nomination: Bare Bones International Film Festival 2009
 Honoree: Director's Showcase, New York B-Movie Film Festival 2008
 Official Selection: Audience Choice Awards 2009
 Official Selection: Connecticut Film Festival 2009

Release
London Betty became available on DVD February 2, 2010 in the United States.

References

External links
 Daniel Von Bargen's last film London Betty, New York Times March 6th, 2015
 London Betty at the Internet Movie Database
 London Betty at Rotten Tomatoes
 London Betty Press Page
 Maverick Entertainment Group

American adventure comedy films
2009 films
2000s English-language films
2000s American films